The Kırcaali Detachment of the Ottoman Empire (Modern Turkish: Kırcaali Müfrezesi or Kırcaali Kolordusu ) was one of the Detachments under the command of the Ottoman Eastern Army. It was formed in Kırcaali (present day: Kardzhali) area during the First Balkan War.

Balkan Wars

Order of Battle, October 17, 1912 
On October 17, 1912, the detachment was structured as follows:

Kırcaali Detachment HQ (Thrace, under the command of the Eastern Army)
Kırcaali Redif Division
Kırcaali Müstahfız (Home Guard) Division (provisional)
36th Infantry Regiment

See also
Battle of Merhamli

Sources

Detachment of the Ottoman Empire
Military units and formations of the Ottoman Empire in the Balkan Wars
Ottoman period in the history of Bulgaria